Tadger may refer to:

 James Stewart (footballer, born 1883) (James "Tadger" Stewart, 1883-1952), English association footballer
 Tommy Tadger, an alias for American pop rock musician Tommy James
 St. Tadger's Day, a fictitious holiday in the BBC2 television comedy series Ripping Yarns
 Tadger, a British slang term for the human penis

See also
 Todger, see Human penis#Terminology
 Penis (disambiguation)